Albert Shingiro (born 31 December 1970) is a Burundian diplomat. He is serving as the Minister of Foreign Affairs and Development Cooperation in the Republic of Burundi.

Background and education 
Shingiro was born in 1970 in Buhiga, Karusi Province in Burundi and he is married with three children. He is an Anglican Christian. In 1998, Shingiro earned a bachelor's degree in Legal and Political Science from the University of Benin and a master's degree in International Relations from Laval University in Canada in 2003. He speaks Kirundi, Swahili, French, and English.

Career 
A career diplomat, Shingiro was appointed to various diplomatic positions. He was the second counselor of the Burundian Embassy between the year 2006 to 2010. In 2012, he was appointed as the permanent secretary of the Ministry of Foreign Affairs, the appointment ended in 2014. In that same 2014, he was appointed as the Ambassador of the Republic of Burundi to the United Nations which ended in June 2020. On the 28 of June 2020, he was appointed as the Minister of Foreign Affairs.

References 

1970 births

Living people
Burundian diplomats
Burundian politicians
Members of the Parliament of Burundi
Government ministers of Burundi